Thomas Burford (died before 1406) was the member of the Parliament of England for Salisbury for multiple parliaments from January 1380 to 1394. He was also mayor of Salisbury.

References 

Members of Parliament for Salisbury
14th-century English politicians
Year of birth unknown
Year of death unknown
English MPs January 1380
English MPs 1381
English MPs October 1382
English MPs October 1383
English MPs 1385
English MPs 1386
English MPs February 1388
English MPs 1394
Mayors of Salisbury
Alnagers
1400s deaths